The streaked Spanish mackerel (Scomberomorus lineolatus) is found mainly in and around India, especially along the Maharashtra and Gujarat coasts. The peak season for fishing this fish is from October to December. It is also known by other names, such as streaked seer, hazard (French), sawara, and carite (Spanish). It is found off Asian coasts from the west coast of India and Sri Lanka east to Java and does not extend east of Wallace's Line. It is an important quarry species for fisheries where it occurs.

References 

 

Commercial fish
Fish described in 1829
Taxa named by Georges Cuvier
Scomberomorus